Owen Davidson and Billie Jean King were the defending champions but lost in the semifinals to Geoff Masters and Pam Teeguarden.

Geoff Masters and Pam Teeguarden won in the final 6–1, 7–6 against Jimmy Connors and Chris Evert. The victors got $2,000.

Seeds

Draw

Finals

Top half

Bottom half

References

External links
1974 US Open – Doubles draws and results at the International Tennis Federation

Mixed Doubles
US Open (tennis) by year – Mixed doubles